Giulio Rapetti (born 17 August 1936), in art Mogol, is an Italian music lyricist. He is best known for his collaborations with Lucio Battisti, Gianni Bella, Adriano Celentano and Mango.

Career
Mogol was born in Milan. His father, Mariano Rapetti, was an important director of the Ricordi record label, and had been in his own time a successful lyricist of the 1950s. Young Giulio, who was likewise employed by Ricordi as a public relations expert, began his own career as a lyricist against his father's wishes.

His first successes were "Il cielo in una stanza", set to music by Gino Paoli and sung by Mina; "Al di là", a piece that won the 1961 Sanremo Festival, performed by Luciano Tajoli and Betty Curtis; "Una lacrima sul viso", which was a huge hit for Bobby Solo in 1964. Another famous song from 1961 was "Uno dei tanti" (English: "One among many") which was rewritten by Jerry Leiber and Mike Stoller in 1963 for Ben E. King and released under the title "I (Who Have Nothing)".

In addition to writing new lyrics in Italian for a great many singers, Mogol also took it upon himself, in years in which familiarity with the English language in Italy was still sparse, to translate many hits from overseas, especially film soundtracks, but also works of Bob Dylan and David Bowie.

In 1965, he met Lucio Battisti, a young guitarist and composer from the Latium region of central Italy. Mogol's lyrics contributed to Battisti's initial success as an author, in megahits such as "29 settembre", and led him to undertake the role of producer as well, as happened with the song "Sognando la California", which Mogol himself had translated from the signature number of The Mamas & the Papas, "California Dreamin'", and with "Senza luce" ("Without light"), an Italian rendering of "A Whiter Shade of Pale" by Procol Harum.

In 1967, in a reversal of Mogol translating English hits to Italian, his 1966 song "Piangi con Me" ("Cry with Me"), co-written with David "Shel" Shapiro of The Rokes (the band that recorded it), would see an English language translation reach #8 on the Billboard Hot 100 singles chart. The song "Let's Live for Today", using English lyrics and title provided by Michael Julien, was a million-selling gold record for The Grass Roots; the prominence of the English version drove the Italian version to gold record status for The Rokes. 

In 1966, Mogol, overcoming resistance from his record label, convinced Battisti to perform his own songs. The lyricist's intuition would have one of the most rewarding outcomes of the history of Italian music, as Battisti, after a halting start, would explode as a singer, becoming one of the most successful artists in the panorama of Italian music. In the same year, Mogol left the Ricordi label to create his own with Battisti, called Numero Uno, which brought together many celebrated Italian singer-songwriters. The pair wrote songs as well for Bruno Lauzi and Patty Pravo. Their greatest chart success came from the songs written for Mina in 1969–1970.

In 1980, Mogol broke the artistic relationship with Battisti, and successfully continued his independent career as a lyricist with the noted singer-songwriter Riccardo Cocciante, with whom he wrote the texts for some successful albums, first in the series being "Cervo a Primavera".

Lately, he began his collaboration with Mango, co-writing successful songs like "Oro", "Nella mia città", "Come Monna Lisa" and "Mediterraneo".

Mogol has formed a stable partnership with Adriano Celentano; his songs for Celentano are scored by the Sicilian singer-songwriter Gianni Bella. This collaboration has produced the delicate song "L'arcobaleno", included in the CD Io non-so parlar d'amore, which is considered dedicated to Battisti, who had recently died.  Mogol has also collaborated with singer-songwriter Jack Rubinacci.

References

This article was translated from the equivalent article in Italian Wikipedia, Retrieved 6 April 2006

External links
  as Mogol
  as Giulio Rapetti
 

1936 births
Living people
Musicians from Milan
Italian lyricists